The Scott Saunders Space Adventure series are a series of young adult science-fiction novels written by amateur astronomer Patrick Moore.

As its title indicates the series depicts the adventures and trials of young astronaut Scott Saunders. The series consist of six books published from 1977 to 1980.

Titles
Spy in Space (August 1977)
Planet of Fear (August 1977)
The Moon Raiders (July 1978)
Killer Comet (September 1978)
The Terror Star (May 1979)
Secret of the Black Hole (November 1980)

References 

1970s science fiction novels
Book series introduced in 1977
Science fiction book series
English science fiction novels
Children's science fiction novels
Space exploration novels
20th-century British novels